The 2023 FIL World Luge Championships was the 51st editon and held from 27 to 29 January 2023 at the Oberhof bobsleigh, luge, and skeleton track in Oberhof, Germany.

Schedule
Nine events were held.

All times are local (UTC+1).

Medal summary

Medalists

References

External links
Official website

 
FIL World Luge Championships
World Championships
FIL
International luge competitions hosted by Germany
FIL
2023 FIL World Luge Championships